Bingo is a 1974 French-Canadian thriller directed by Jean-Claude Lord. The plot relates to Quebec's October Crisis of 1970.

Synopsis

Director Jean-Claude Lord exploits the post-October Crisis paranoia that was rampant in Quebec with considerable panache with this skilful melodrama. Although the story is not about the events leading up to the War Measures Act, it does draw upon the fabric and feelings of that time. A young photographer (Réjean Guénette) becomes unwittingly entangled in a terrorist organization, which engages in a plot against prominent politicians and business leaders before an upcoming election. The film was hugely popular in Quebec and established Lord as a major director with this, his third feature.

Soundtrack
Lord's wife, and co-screenwriter, the actress Lise Thouin released "Bingo", written by Michel Conte as a single.

Reception
The film was well received in Quebec but failed to find an audience elsewhere, grossing $1.5 million in Canada.

References

External links
 

1974 films
1970s French-language films
French-language Canadian films
Canadian thriller films
1970s Canadian films
Films directed by Jean-Claude Lord